John Frederick Peto (May 21, 1854 – November 23, 1907) was an American trompe-l'œil ("fool the eye") painter who was long forgotten until his paintings were rediscovered along with those of fellow trompe-l'œil artist William Harnett.

Career
Although Peto and the slightly older Harnett knew each other and painted similar subjects, their careers followed different paths. Peto was born in Philadelphia, Pennsylvania, and studied at the Pennsylvania Academy of the Fine Arts at the same time as Harnett. Until he was in his mid-thirties, he submitted paintings regularly to the annual exhibitions at the Philadelphia Academy. In 1889, he moved to the resort town of Island Heights, New Jersey, where he worked in obscurity for the rest of his life. He and his wife took in seasonal boarders, he found work playing cornet at the town's camp revival meetings, and he supplemented his income by selling his paintings to tourists. He never had a gallery exhibition in his lifetime. Harnett, on the other hand, achieved success and had considerable influence on other artists painting in the trompe-l'œil genre, but even his paintings were given the snub by critics as mere novelty and trickery.

Both artists were masters of trompe-l'œil, a genre of still life that aims to deceive the viewer into mistaking painted objects for reality. Exploiting the fallibility of human perception, the trompe-l'œil painter depicts objects in accordance with a set of rules unique to the genre. For example, Peto and Harnett both represented the objects in their paintings at their actual size, and the objects rarely were cut off by the edge of the painting, as this would allow a visual cue to the viewer that the depiction was not real. But the main technical device was to arrange the subject matter in a shallow space, using the shadow of the objects to suggest depth without the eye seeing actual depth. Thus the term trompe-l'œil—"fool the eye". Both artists enthrall the viewer with a disturbing but pleasant sense of confusion.

Peto's paintings, generally considered less technically skilled than Harnett's, are more abstract, use more unusual color, and often have a stronger emotional resonance. Peto's mature works have an opaque and powdery texture which is often compared to Chardin.

The subject matter of Peto's paintings consisted of the most ordinary of things: pistols, horseshoes, bits of paper, keys, books, and the like. He frequently painted old time "letter racks", which were a kind of board that used ribbons tacked into a square that held notes, letters, pencils, and photographs. Many of Peto's paintings reinterpret themes Harnett had painted earlier, but Peto's compositions are less formal and his objects are typically rustier, more worn, less expensive looking.

Other artists who practiced trompe-l'œil in the late nineteenth century include John Haberle and Jefferson David Chalfant.  Otis Kaye followed several decades later.

A pioneering study of Peto and Harnett is Alfred Frankenstein's After the Hunt, William Harnett and Other American Still Life Painters 1870-1900. Frankenstein's book itself is a fantastic tale of solving the mystery of why these artists were forgotten for much of the twentieth century.

John F. Peto Studio Museum
The John F. Peto Studio Museum preserves the artist's house and studio in Island Heights, New Jersey. Built in 1889, the house was mostly designed by the artist and remained in his family for over 100 years. Opened in 2011, the house has been furnished to appear as during Peto's residency around the turn of the 20th century, and features reproductions of his paintings. Painter Abbey Ryan also teaches an annual professional painting workshop at the John F. Peto Studio Museum.

Gallery

Notes

References
Frankenstein, Alfred (1970). The Reality of Appearance. Greenwich: New York Graphic Society. 
Schwartz, Sanford (1990). Artists and Writers. New York: Yarrow Press. 
Wilmerding, John (1983).Important Information Inside. New York: Harper & Row.

External links

John F. Peto Studio Museum - official site
Peto Gallery at MuseumSyndicate
John Frederick Peto And Peto Family Papers Online at the Smithsonian Archives of American Art
American paintings & historical prints from the Middendorf collection, an exhibition catalog from The Metropolitan Museum of Art (fully available online as PDF), which contains material on Peto (no. 45)

1854 births
1907 deaths
19th-century American painters
19th-century American male artists
American male painters
20th-century American painters
People from Island Heights, New Jersey
American still life painters
Artists from New Jersey
Artists from Philadelphia
Pennsylvania Academy of the Fine Arts alumni
Trompe-l'œil artists
20th-century American male artists